Ivor Godfrey Balding (23 May 1908 – 20 January 2005) was a British champion polo player, thoroughbred farm manager and racehorse trainer.

Biography

Breeding farm manager
Ivor Balding had two brothers who also played polo, Gerald Barnard Balding, Sr. and Barney Balding. He moved to the United States in 1930 where he attended Cornell University. In 1936, he went to work for the Thoroughbred breeding farm of Sonny Whitney in Old Westbury, New York. Three years later Whitney appointed him manager of his key breeding operation in Lexington, Kentucky.

During his tenure in Lexington, Balding encouraged Whitney to import Mahmoud from England where he had won the 1936 Epsom Derby. Brought to the United States in 1940,  Mahmoud would prove to be an outstanding sire of seventy stakes winners and was the Leading sire in North America in 1946 and the Leading broodmare sire in North America for 1957. Of most importance to bloodlines worldwide, Mahmoud was the broodmare sire of Natalma, dam of the legendary Northern Dancer who became the most successful sire of the 20th Century and whom the National Thoroughbred Racing Association calls "one of the most influential sires in Thoroughbred history".

Training career
From 1961 to 1992, Ivor Balding was the head trainer for Whitney's racing stable during which time he earned the leading trainer title in 1966 at Saratoga Race Course. He died at age 96 in Camden, South Carolina.

References

British polo players
1908 births
2005 deaths
Ivor Balding
American racehorse trainers
Sportspeople from Leicester
Cornell University alumni
People from Old Westbury, New York
Sportspeople from Lexington, Kentucky
People from Camden, South Carolina
Horse trainers from Lexington, Kentucky
English polo players
British racehorse trainers